Edison Bridge, the name of various bridges named after Thomas Edison, may refer to

Edison Bridge (Florida)
Edison Bridge (New Jersey)
Edison Bridge (Ohio)